Yali (Yaly, Jalè, Jaly) is a Papuan language of Indonesian New Guinea. The Yali people live east of the Baliem Valley, in the Western Highlands.

Dialectical differentiation is great enough that Ethnologue assigns separate codes to three varieties:
Pass Valley, also known as Abendago, North Ngalik, and Western Yali; subdialects are Pass Valley, Landikma, Apahapsili.
Ninia, also known as North Ngalik and Southern Yali (Yali Selatan).
Angguruk, also known as Northern Yali.
However, almost nothing is known of this language. Not even the pronouns were attested for Ross (2005) to base a classification on.

Siegfried Zoellner, a German missionary, has between 1960 and 1973 translated the bible into the Yali language.

Phonology
The phonology of the Yali language:

A /ɡ/ sound at the end of words is pronounced .

Basic words and phrases
The following is a list of basic words and phrases in the Yali language:
  - how are you
  - thank you
  - you're welcome
  - friend
  - good
  - that
  - this
  - and
  - speak/talk
  - language
  - man
  - my news/state
  - your (sg.) news/state
  - for myself
  - for yourself
  - for him/herself
  - for ourselves
  - for yourselves/themselves
  - *end of statement particle
  - I am pleased
  - I like that
  - I have
  - S/he is my friend
  - They are my friends
  - S/he is a good friend
  - My friends are from America
  - I speak Yali

Pronouns
Personal pronouns of the Yali language

References

External links
 Yali (Apahapsili) DoReCo corpus compiled by Sonja Riesberg. Audio recordings of narrative texts with transcriptions time-aligned at the phone level, translations, and time-aligned morphological annotations.

Dani languages
Languages of western New Guinea